The 2004 Rallye Deutschland (formally the 23. OMV ADAC Rallye Deutschland) was the tenth round of the 2004 World Rally Championship season. The race was held over three days between 20 August and 22 August 2004, and was based in Trier, Germany. Citroën's Sébastien Loeb won the race, his 9th win in the World Rally Championship.

Background

Entry list

Itinerary
All dates and times are CEST (UTC+2).

Results

Overall

World Rally Cars

Classification

Special stages

Championship standings

Production World Rally Championship

Classification

Special stages

Championship standings

References

External links 
 Official website of the World Rally Championship
 2004 Rallye Deutschland at Rallye-info 

Deutschland
Rallye Deutschland
Rallye